Finnish vehicle registration plates usually carry three letters and three numbers separated with a dash (e.g. ABC-123), though vanity plates may carry 2-3 letters and 1-3 numbers. Since 1989 the code has no connection with the geographic location, except that Åland has its own type of plate. Between 1972/1973 and 1989 the first letter indicated where the vehicle was first registered as the plate did not have to be changed even if the vehicle was moved to another area of Finland.

History

1917–1922: Right after gaining independence, different licence plates were issued for each city.
1922–1929: The standard plate had a white background, on which a provincial designation and four-digit number was marked.
1930s–1940s: Annual plates were issued. Plates for odd-numbered years were white with black markings and plates for even-numbered years were black with white markings. The registration number consisted of a provincial designation, dash and a (maximum) four-digit number. A seal and the last two digits of the current year were marked on the left side of the plate.
1950: Annual plates were no longer issued. The standard registration number consisted of two letters, a dash and a (maximum) three-digit number, embossed in white on a black background. The first letter was the provincial designation.
1960: A white border was added to the plate. The registration number consisted of three letters, a dash and one or two numbers.
1972: The current licence plate type was introduced.
1996: The size of the vehicle licence plate was reduced. The old dimensions were 123 mm x 342 mm and 123 mm x 397 mm.
2001: EU licence plates were introduced.

Codes (1922 to 1972)
A = Helsinki city
B = Helsinki
C = Helsinki
E = Turku
F = Turku
G = Kymi
H = Häme
I = Häme
K = Kuopio
L = Lappi
M = Mikkeli
N = Häme until 1961
O = Oulu
R = Kymi
S = Pohjois-Karjala
T = Turku
U = Uusimaa
V = Vaasa (originally VA with four digits)
X = Keski-Suomi
Y = Vaasa
Z = Uusimaa
ÅL = Åland (with four digits)

Current
The registration number consists of two or three letters and a (maximum) three-digit number, embossed in black on a white, reflective field. A dash appears between the letter and number series.

Licence plate dimensions are 118 mm x 442 mm or 200 mm x 256 mm.

Hole location/long plate: longitudinally 63.5 mm from the edge, vertically 59.0 mm from the edge (hole diameter 7 mm).
Hole location/high plate: longitudinally 18.0 mm from the edge, vertically 100.0 mm from the edge (hole diameter 7 mm).

Old model licence plate dimensions are 118 mm x 397 mm or 118 mm x 338 mm.

Hole location (118 mm x 397 mm): longitudinally 18.75 mm from the edge, vertically 59.6 mm from the edge (hole diameter 7 mm).
Hole location (118 mm x 338 mm): longitudinally 16.75 mm from the edge, vertically 59.6 mm from the edge (hole diameter 7 mm).

On the vehicle designated for the President of the Finnish Republic, the licence plates can be replaced with the Finnish coat of arms.

An Åland number-plate has blue lettering. The official international vehicle registration code is FIN as in the rest of Finland, but the Parliament of Åland wants to introduce "AX" as its official code.

Plates from Åland always begin with ÅL. Until 2011 they were always 3 letters and 1-3 numbers like rest of Finland, but in 2011 the plates started to have ÅL and 5 digits.

Codes
Regular, non-vanity plates also have some more limitations:
2-3 letters & 1-3 numbers (5 in Åland)
The letters used are A-Z and Å, Ä & Ö
The letter part may not begin with P, W or D (used for trailers, but if you want to buy a specific plate then you can have also these letters in the beginning)
The number part may not begin with 0

Special plates

Export registration licence plates contain one letter and a (maximum) four-digit number.

A diplomatic number plate has a blue background and white reflective lettering. The letters are either "C" or "CD", for French "Corps Diplomatique". CD plates are with maximum of four numbers and C maximum of five numbers.

Museum registered cars have black plates which have two or three letters and maximum of three numbers with white colour. Size on the plate is 118 mm x 338 mm.

Museum registered motorcycles have black plates which have two letters and maximum of three numbers with white colour. Size on the plate is 119 mm x 280 mm

Tractors and other similar work vehicles have maximum of three numbers and maximum of three letters, separated by a middot, with black
on reflective yellow background.

Temporary license plates, or actually single-use stickers, are only plates in a plastic, with a red lettering. They have two letters (originally one) and maximum of four numbers. Stickers have glue stripes on both sides, so they can be attached either outside of the car or inside of rear- and windscreens. These are most commonly used during rallies.
 

Test series ("experiment").

References

External links 
 
 Finnish license plates

Finland
Road transport in Finland
Finland transport-related lists
 Registration plates